Billy Hogan (October 10, 1933 - June 6, 1994) was a singer and songwriter. He was born in Elkmont, AL. He recorded several singles for the Vena label in the 1950s. He is remembered for writing Ernie Ashworth's 1962 hit Each Moment.

References

1933 births
1994 deaths
American country singer-songwriters
People from Limestone County, Alabama
Singer-songwriters from Alabama
20th-century American male singers
20th-century American singers
Country musicians from Alabama